Kendalls may refer to:

 BDO Kendalls, one of the largest accounting firms in Australia outside of the Big Four
 The Kendalls, the US Country music group
 Kendall & Sons. Kendall's, the UK umbrella manufacturer and ladies fashion retailer